Count Johan August Sandels (31 August 1764 – 22 January 1831) was a Swedish soldier and politician, being appointed Governor-general of Norway (Riksståthållare in Swedish, Rigsstatholder in Dano-Norwegian) 1818 and Field Marshal in 1824. He also served as acting Governor of Stockholm in 1815.

Biography 
Sandels was born in Stockholm. In the Finnish War (1808–1809) on 27 October 1808, he led the Swedish troops to victory against the Russian forces, at the Battle of Koljonvirta. His subordinate officers were Colonel Fahlander, Major Malm and Major Joachim Zachris Duncker.

These events and others in the Finnish War were later retold in a series of epic poems by Johan Ludvig Runeberg. Runeberg's poem tells a story of Sandels having a feast while the enemy mounts a premature attack. Sandels continues his meal and is accused of cowardice, after which he raises and rides to the battle, drives back the enemy and is praised by his men.

Sandels also fought in the Swedish ranks against Napoleon during the War of the Sixth Coalition in 1813 and 1814. He received some award for his services in form of a donation lands in the then Swedish Pomerania.

His granddaughter, Augusta Sandels, married Philip, Prince of Eulenburg and Hertefeld, bringing some Pomeranian inheritance to the Eulenburg family and her descendants. The couple were granted the Prussian title of Count Sandels, in addition to their other titles.

Named after Sandels 

Sandels is a beer brewed by Olvi since 1971. Humorous stories about Colonel Sandels (and his love of beer and food) are printed on the back label. Sandels was named the top rated beer brand in Finland in a 2015 study.

See also 
 The Tales of Ensign Stål

References

External links 

 Biography of Johan August Sandels
 

1764 births
1831 deaths
Military personnel from Stockholm
Swedish nobility
Field marshals of Sweden
Swedish military personnel of the Finnish War
19th-century Swedish people
Swedish military commanders of the Napoleonic Wars
Governors-general of Norway

Johan August